Alpagut  is a small town in Mihalgazi district of  Eskişehir Province, Turkey. Main economic sector of the town is fruit farming. (pomegranate figs plums grapes etc.)

References

Populated places in Eskişehir Province
Towns in Turkey
Mıhalgazi District